Kershaw County is a county located in the U.S. state of South Carolina. As of the 2020 census, its population was 65,403. The county seat and largest city is Camden. The county was created in 1791 from parts of Claremont, Lancaster, Fairfield, and Richland counties. It is named for Col. Joseph Kershaw (1727–1791), an early settler and American Revolutionary War patriot.

Kershaw County is part of the Columbia, South Carolina Metropolitan Statistical Area.

History 
Kershaw County was named for Col. Joseph Kershaw (1727–1791), an early settler considered as "the father of Camden". Originally part of Camden District, Kershaw County was formed in 1791 from parts of Claremont, Lancaster, Fairfield, and Richland counties. The county seat is Camden, the oldest inland city in South Carolina. This site was settled around 1732 by English traders and farmers who moved inland from Charleston. Welsh Baptists moved the area in large numbers in the 1740s and 1750s. At the time, in England and Wales Protestants who were not from the established Anglican church were politically disadvantaged in various ways, however, in South Carolina they could still practice freely (provided that they called their churches "meeting houses.") Baptists from Abergavenny, Trap, Carmarthenshire, Llanbedr, Crickhowell, Vale of Grwyney, Abertillery, Griffithstown and Brecon arrived in what has since become Kershaw County between 1740 and 1760, primarily arriving as large family units. They were joined by a similar migration of English Baptists who came from Long Sutton, Lincolnshire, Boston, Lincolnshire, Coningsby, Grantham, as well as Christchurch, Dorset and Lymington. From about 1800 until about 1867, the county was known as Kershaw District.

During the American Revolutionary War, the British occupied Camden from June 1780 to May 1781. Fourteen battles took place in the area, including the Battle of Camden in 1780 and the Battle of Hobkirk's Hill in 1781.

After the state seceded from the Union, six men from Kershaw served in the American Civil War as Confederate generals: James Cantey (1818–1873), James Chesnut (1815–1885), John Doby Kennedy (1840–1896), Joseph Brevard Kershaw (1822–1894), and John Bordenave Villepigue (1830–1862), Zachariah C. Deas (1819–1882). Richard Rowland Kirkland, a Confederate soldier and hero at the Battle of Fredericksburg, was also from Kershaw County. He served under General Kershaw. In the last months of the war, Union troops under Gen. William T. Sherman burned parts of Camden in February 1865, in their March to the Sea.

Under the 1868 South Carolina Constitution, the Kershaw District became home rule Kershaw County with the state representatives also being county commissioners. During the Reconstruction era, some freedmen and other men of color were elected to various political offices. Among them was Henry Cardozo, who had been pastor of Old Bethel Methodist Church in Charleston, South Carolina. He served in the state senate as a Republican from Kershaw County, from 1870 to 1874.  (February 1, 1836 – July 22, 1903) was an American clergyman, politician, and educator. When Francis Lewis Cardozo was elected in South Carolina as Secretary of State in 1868, he was the first African American to hold a statewide office in the United States.

During World War I, two Kershaw County men were awarded the Medal of Honor in two separate actions while fighting in France in October 1918. The first was Richmond Hobson Hilton, recognized for actions taking place on October 11, 1918, during which he lost an arm. The second was John Canty Villepigue on October 15, 1918; he was wounded so severely in the action for which he was recognized that he died several months later from his injuries. Villepigue was a descendant of General John B. Villepigue noted above.

Statesman and financier Bernard M. Baruch (1870–1965), labor leader Lane Kirkland, and baseball player Larry Doby, the first African-American player in the American League, were each born in Kershaw County. Former South Carolina Governor John C. West was also from Kershaw County.

Geography

Kershaw County is one of three counties that compromises Lake Wateree, in which the lake is compromised with the Wateree River, which flows through Kershaw County.

Earthquakes
Between December 2021 and December 2022, southeastern Kershaw County experienced over 80 earthquakes, 11 of which exceeded a 2.5 magnitude. 6 of the quakes exceeded a 3.0 magnitude, the largest of which registering at a 3.6.

National Protected areas 
 Historic Camden Revolutionary War Site
 Camden Battlefield, site of the Battle of Camden
 Boykin Mill Complex
 Kendall Mill Historic District

State and local protected areas 
 Camden Battlefield and Longleaf Pine Preserve
 Goodale State Park
 Powderkegg Wildlife Preserve
 Savage Bay Heritage Park

Major water bodies 
 Beaver Creek
 Black Creek
 Catawba River
 Lake Wateree
 Lynches River
 Raglins Creek
 Wateree River

Adjacent counties 
 Richland County – southwest
 Lee County – southeast
 Fairfield County – west
 Lancaster County – north
 Chesterfield County – northeast
 Darlington County – east

Major highways 
 
 
  (Camden)
  (Cheraw)
 
 
 
  (Camden 1)
  (Camden 2)
  (Kershaw)

Major infrastructure 
 Camden Station
 Woodward Field (Kershaw County Airport)

Demographics

2020 census

As of the 2020 United States census, there were 65,403 people, 24,544 households, and 16,019 families residing in the county.

2010 census
As of the 2010 United States Census, there were 61,697 people, 23,928 households, and 17,114 families living in the county. The racial makeup of the county was 71.3% white, 24.6% black or African American, 0.5% Asian, 0.3% American Indian, 1.7% from other races, and 1.6% from two or more races. Those of Hispanic or Latino origin made up 3.7% of the population. In terms of ancestry, 28.1% were American, 7.8% were English, 7.7% were Irish, and 6.3% were German.

Of the 23,928 households, 34.9% had children under the age of 18 living with them, 51.6% were married couples living together, 15.1% had a female householder with no husband present, 28.5% were non-families, and 24.5% of all households were made up of individuals. The average household size was 2.56 and the average family size was 3.02. The median age was 40.2 years.

The median income for a household in the county was $44,064 and the median income for a family was $53,053. Males had a median income of $40,794 versus $30,553 for females. The per capita income for the county was $21,777. About 12.1% of families and 15.5% of the population were below the poverty line, including 21.6% of those under age 18 and 11.5% of those age 65 or over.

2000 census
As of the census of 2000, there were 52,647 people, 20,188 households, and 14,918 families living in the county.  The population density was 72 people per square mile (28/km2).  There were 22,683 housing units at an average density of 31 per square mile (12/km2).  The racial makeup of the county was 71.61% White, 26.29% Black or African American, 0.29% Native American, 0.31% Asian, 0.03% Pacific Islander, 0.62% from other races, and 0.84% from two or more races.  1.68% of the population were Hispanic or Latino of any race.

There were 20,188 households, out of which 33.70% had children under the age of 18 living with them, 55.80% were married couples living together, 13.60% had a female householder with no husband present, and 26.10% were non-families. 22.60% of all households were made up of individuals, and 8.90% had someone living alone who was 65 years of age or older.  The average household size was 2.58 and the average family size was 3.02.

In the county, the population was spread out, with 26.10% under the age of 18, 7.60% from 18 to 24, 28.80% from 25 to 44, 24.50% from 45 to 64, and 12.90% who were 65 years of age or older.  The median age was 37 years. For every 100 females, there were 93.40 males.  For every 100 females age 18 and over, there were 90.00 males.

The median income for a household in the county was $38,804, and the median income for a family was $44,836. Males had a median income of $32,246 versus $22,714 for females. The per capita income for the county was $18,360.  About 9.70% of families and 12.80% of the population were below the poverty line, including 16.90% of those under age 18 and 14.10% of those age 65 or over.

Government and politics

Education
The Kershaw County School District serves as the governing body for all public schools in Kershaw County.

Central Carolina Technical College has two branches located in Camden.

Kershaw County is home to Camden Military Academy, the official state military academy of South Carolina. The Montessori School of Camden is a public charter located in Camden.

High schools
 Camden High School
 Lugoff-Elgin High School
 North Central High School
 Woolard Technology Center

Middle schools
 Camden Middle School
 Lugoff-Elgin Middle School
 North Central Middle School
 Leslie M. Stover Middle School
 Montessori School of Camden

Elementary schools
 Camden Elementary School
 Lugoff Elementary School
 Wateree Elementary School
 Blaney Elementary School
 Doby's Mill Elementary School
 North Central Elementary School
 Midway Elementary School
 Pine Tree Hill Elementary School
 Jackson Elementary School
 Montessori School of Camden

Communities

City
 Camden (county seat and largest city)

Towns
 Bethune
 Elgin

Census-designated places
 Abney Crossroads
 Boykin
 East Camden
 Lugoff

Other unincorporated communities
 Antioch
 Buffalo
 Cassatt
 DeKalb
 Liberty Hill
 Mt. Pisgah
 Westville

Gallery

See also
 List of counties in South Carolina
 National Register of Historic Places listings in Kershaw County, South Carolina
 South Carolina State Parks

References

External links

 
 
 Kershaw Chamber of Commerce
 Kershaw County History and Images

 
Columbia metropolitan area (South Carolina)
1791 establishments in South Carolina
Populated places established in 1791